Yelta is a small locality in Victoria, Australia. It was for a short time in the 1870s and 1880s the Victorian administrative centre of what is now Sunraysia and the Millewa. This role was then taken over by Mildura.

It is notable for containing the terminus of the Melbourne-Mildura railway line.

History
Yelta Aboriginal Mission (1855–1868) was established by the Church of England on the banks of the Murray River Local aboriginal people called a small billabong near the site of the mission, Yelta.

Military history

During World War II, Yelta was the location of RAAF No.29 Inland Aircraft Fuel Depot (IAFD), completed in 1942 and closed on 14 June 1944. Usually consisting of 4 tanks, 31 fuel depots were built across Australia for the storage and supply of aircraft fuel for the RAAF and the US Army Air Forces at a total cost of £900,000 ($1,800,000).

References

Towns in Victoria (Australia)
Populated places on the Murray River
Mallee (Victoria)